This is a list of vice presidents of the United States who owned slaves. Slavery was legal in the United States from its beginning as a nation, having been practiced in North America since early colonial days. The Thirteenth Amendment of the United States Constitution formally abolished slavery in 1865, after the end of the American Civil War.

At least nine vice presidents owned slaves at some point in their lives. Thomas Jefferson was the first while Andrew Johnson was the last.

Vice presidents who owned slaves

See also

List of presidents of the United States who owned slaves
Abolitionism in the United States
District of Columbia Compensated Emancipation Act (1862), which ended slavery in Washington, D.C.
John Quincy Adams and abolitionism
List of slave owners
Slavery in the District of Columbia
Slavery in the United States
Treatment of slaves in the United States

References

 
Slaves
Vice presidents